Luis Gutiérrez (born 1953) is a U.S. Representative from Illinois.

Luis Gutiérrez may also refer to:

 Luis Gutiérrez (wine critic) (born 1965), wine critic based in Madrid, Spain
 Luis Alberto Gutiérrez (born 1985), Bolivian football defender
 Luis Gutierrez (artist) (born 1933), Mexican-American artist based in Los Gatos, California
 Luis Felipe Gutiérrez (born 1988), Paralympic athlete from Cuba
 Luis Gutiérrez Soto (1900–1977), Spanish architect